Daniel the Traveller, known also as Daniel the Pilgrim, Daniel of Kiev, or Abbot Daniel,  was the first travel writer from the Kievan Rus. He is known for travelling to the Holy Land in the aftermath of the First Crusade and his descriptions are important records of the region during that time.

Travels

Origin
Archimandrite Daniel journeyed to the West from the Rus monastery where he lived as an igumen. This monastery was probably near Chernihiv in Ukraine, in the Land of Chernihivshchyna.

Constantinople, Greece, Cyprus
Daniel's journeys took him to Constantinople, then by way of Cyprus to the Holy Land.

Daniel's narratives begin at Constantinople. He began his travels in the early 12th century and was likely in Constantinople around 1106 to 1108.

Holy Land
Daniel stayed in the Jerusalem area for over a year and took various trips around Palestine and Syria. During this time he explored the Dead Sea, Hebron, and Damascus. He learned much of the regions from his three major excursions to the Dead Sea and Lower Jordan (which he compares to the Snov River), Bethlehem and Hebron, and Damascus. Daniel wrote his journeys in narratives he titled Puteshestive igumena Daniila — Life and Pilgrimage of Daniel, Hegumen from the Land of the Rus.

When coming to Jerusalem from Jaffa, he mentions that this was where ‘Saracens sally forth and kill travellers’, he also attested to several venerable sites that was ‘destroyed by the pagans’. When going to Lake Tiberias, he dodged ‘fierce pagans who attack travellers at the river-fords’ and lions that roamed the countryside in ‘great numbers’. He prayed for his life when he walked unescorted on the narrow pass between Mount Tabor and Nazareth as he was warned that local villagers do ‘kill travellers in those terrible mountains’. He survived the trip, returning to Kyiv with a small piece of the rock from Christ’s tomb kept by him as a relic.

Daniel's description of the Holy Land preserves a record of conditions that are peculiarly characteristic of the time. He describes the Saracen raiding almost up to the walls of Christian Jerusalem and the friendly relations between Roman and Eastern churches in Syria. Daniel visited Palestine in the reign of Baldwin I of Jerusalem and apparently soon after the crusader capture of Acre in 1104. He claims to have accompanied Baldwin on an expedition against Damascus (c. 1107). Daniel's narratives show that Baldwin treated him with much friendliness.

Daniel records that several of his friends from Kyiv and Old Novgorod were present with him at the Easter Eve miracle in the Church of the Holy Sepulchre.

Significance

12th-century Holy Land
Daniel's account of Jerusalem is descriptive and accurate. His observant and detailed record of Palestine is one of the most valuable medieval documents that exist. Daniel had some knowledge of both Greek and Latin and so was able to use interpreters. He writes, It is impossible to come to know all the holy places without guides and interpreters. He writes of a holy man of great learning, well advanced in years, who had lived in the Galilee for thirty years and had accompanied him in Palestine, however he made some major mistakes in topography and history. Daniel visited about sixty places in the area.

Travel literature
While Daniel was not the first traveller to leave the Rus, his travels were the first which there are written records of. There were warriors, merchants, and earlier pilgrims who had travelled from the Kievan Rus to the outside world before the twelfth century; however, none left written records that have come down to the present day. Daniel was one of the first European travellers to travel long distances on foot and keep a written account of his travels – a travelog.

Church history
Daniel's narratives are also important in the history of the Old East Slavic language and in the study of ritual and liturgy of the time (i.e. description of the Easter services in Jerusalem and the Descent of the Holy Fire).

Manuscripts
There are seventy-six manuscripts of Daniel's narratives of which only five are before the year 1500. The oldest of his narratives is dated 1475 of which three editions still exist in Saint Petersburg at the Library of Ecclesiastical History.

Notes

Bibliography

Daniel's text
Mme B. de Khitrovo, Itineraires russes en orient, (Geneva, 1889) (Societe de l'orient Latin); in French.
 Charles William Wilson, C.W. Wilson's edition (Palestine Pilgrims' Text Society, London, 1895) at holyfire.org. Accessed 6 September 2020.
 C.W. Wilson's edition from Colorado State University - Pueblo

Nasir Khusraw's text
Nasir Khusraw (1004–1088), A Journey through Syria and Palestine, translated and annotated by Guy Le Strange (1888). Palestine Pilgrims' Text Society, Vol IV.

Secondary literature
Anzovin, Steven, Famous First Facts''', H. W. Wilson Company (2000), 
C. R. Beazley, Dawn of Modern Geography, ii. 155–174. (C. R. B.), has the account of Daniel.
I. P. Sakharov's (St Petersburg, 1849), Narratives of the Russian People, vol. ii. bk. viii. pp. 1–45.Merriam-Webster's Encyclopedia of Literature, Merriam-Webster (1995), 
C.W. Wilson, ed., The Pilgrimage of the Russian Abbot Daniel to the Holy Land, 1106-1107 A.D.'' (London, 1895).

External links
 Danylo, the Ukrainian 12th-century pilgrim with details and map of his travels.

Rurik dynasty
Ukrainian writers
Russian writers
Russian explorers
Russian travel writers
Pilgrimage accounts
Year of death unknown
Year of birth unknown